Novorossiyka is a rural locality (a selo) in Verkhnebelsky Selsoviet of Romnensky District, Amur Oblast, Russia. The population was 148 as of 2018. There are 3 streets.

Geography 
Novorossiyka is located left bank of the Belaya River, 42 km southwest of Romny (the district's administrative centre) by road. Pozdeyevka is the nearest rural locality.

References 

Rural localities in Romnensky District